Queen of Ceylon is a title that may refer to:

the head of state of Ceylon from 1952 to 1972
Elizabeth II, the only person to hold this position; between 1948 and 1952, George VI was King of Ceylon
any queen of Sri Lanka, see List of Sri Lankan monarchs